Steven T. Kuykendall (January 27, 1947 – January 22, 2021) was an American politician and Republican member of the U.S. House of Representatives from  from 1999 to 2001 in the 106th Congress. He defeated Democrat Janice Hahn in the 1998 election with 49% of the vote. He was narrowly defeated for re-election in 2000 by his predecessor Jane Harman, who had relinquished her seat to run for Governor in 1998. Kuykendall was the only freshman congressman to be defeated for re-election in 2000.

Life and career

A resident of the Palos Verdes Peninsula, Kuykendall was born in McAlester, Oklahoma. He studied at Oklahoma City University and earned his MBA from San Diego State University. Kuykendall also served in the United States Marine Corps for two tours in the Vietnam War.

Political career
Prior to becoming a congressman in 1999, Kuykendall was a member of the California State Assembly between 1994 and 1998. He was elected to the Assembly by defeating incumbent Betty Karnette.

In 1998, he successfully waged a campaign for Congress and served in the 106th Congress from January 3, 1999 to January 3, 2001. He was an unsuccessful candidate for re-election in 2000. In the US House, Kuykendall served on the Armed Services, Science, and the Transportation and Infrastructure Committees.

Kuykendall ran again for the Assembly in 2004 but was unsuccessful. He also served on the Rancho Palos Verdes City Council from 1991 to 1994, holding the position of mayor in 1994.  His political archives were donated to the California State University, Long Beach library.

In 2012, he ran for the newly created 47th congressional district. He placed third in the jungle primary and did not make the November runoff, which was won by Democrat Alan Lowenthal.

In January 2021, Kuykendall signed a letter calling on Republicans to impeach President Donald Trump after the 2021 storming of the United States Capitol.

Death
He died of pulmonary fibrosis on January 22, 2021, in Long Beach, California at age 73.

Electoral history

References

External links

Official site
CNN candidate profile
Voting record maintained by The Washington Post

Join California Steven T. Kuykendall

1947 births
2021 deaths
American Presbyterians
Mayors of places in California
Republican Party members of the California State Assembly
Oklahoma City University alumni
People from Rancho Palos Verdes, California
People from McAlester, Oklahoma
San Diego State University alumni
Military personnel from Oklahoma
United States Marines
Republican Party members of the United States House of Representatives from California
Northwest Classen High School alumni
Deaths from pulmonary fibrosis
Members of Congress who became lobbyists
Politicians from Oklahoma